The Navy of the Russian Federation inherited the ranks of the Soviet Navy, although the insignia and uniform were slightly altered. The navy predominantly uses naval-style ranks but also uses army-style ranks for some specialisations, including naval aviation, marine infantry, medical and legal.

Ranks and insignia - naval services

Officers
The following table of navy ranks illustrates those of the Russian Federation.  The English translation is given first, followed by the rank in Russian.

Warrant officers and ratings
Warrant officers and rates of the Russian Navy

Ranks and insignia - ground and air services of the Navy
The following tables illustrates the ranks of the Russian Federation's naval infantry and shore establishment services.

Officers
Commissioned officers of the Russian Navy - naval infantry, shore services and navy air force.

Warrant officers and other ranks
Warrant officers and other ranks  of the Russian Navy - naval infantry, shore services and navy air force.

Rank titles are sometimes modified due to a particular assignment, branch or status:
The ranks of servicemen assigned to a "guards" unit, formation or ship are preceded by the word “guards”;
The ranks of servicemen in the legal, medical and veterinary branches are followed by “of justice”, “of the medical service”, and “of the veterinary service”, respectively;
The ranks of servicemen in the reserve or in retirement are followed by “of the reserve” or “in retirement”, respectively;
The rank descriptor "of aviation" was officially abolished but is still commonly used, common use of it, however, is being phrased out.

Rank insignia of civilian personnel

See also
Russian military ranks
Army ranks and insignia of the Russian Federation
Russian military
Ranks and insignia of the Soviet military

External links
 Federal Law No. 58-FZ from March 12, 1998 "On military duty and military service"  (in Russian)
 Presidential Decree No. 531 from May 8, 2005 "On military uniform, rank insignia of the servicemen and state bodies' rank insignia"  (in Russian)
Naval insignia on Uniforminsignia.net
Russian military

Notes

References

 
Russian Navy
Russian Federation Navy